Open sesame is a magical phrase in the story of Ali Baba.

Open Sesame may also refer to:

 Open Sesame (TV series), a children's television series based on Sesame Street
 Iftah Ya Simsim, an Arabic language children's TV series also based on Sesame Street whose name translates as "Open Sesame"
 Open Sesame (Freddie Hubbard album), 1960
 Open Sesame (Kool & the Gang album), 1976
 "Open Sesame" (Kool & the Gang song), the title track
 Open Sesame (Shaft album)
 Open Sesame (Whodini album), 1987
 "Open Sesame" (song), by Leila K
 Open Sesame, a novel by Tom Holt